Las Vegas is a tiny resort of the Costa de Oro in the Canelones Department of southern Uruguay.

References

External links
INE map of Parque del Plata, La Floresta, Estación La Floresta, Costa Azul and Bello Horizonte

Populated places in the Canelones Department
Seaside resorts in Uruguay